Garth McArthur Fitzgerald Joseph (born August 8, 1973) is a Dominican former professional basketball player.

At 7'2" and 315 pounds, his physique was often compared to that of Shaquille O'Neal, especially when he was a young and raw-skilled center at The College of St. Rose.  However, he only appeared in a total of four National Basketball Association games, two with the Denver Nuggets and two with the Toronto Raptors during the 2000–01 NBA season. As of the 2018 offseason, Joseph is still the only Dominiquais player in NBA history.

Joseph was a member of the Dominica national basketball team.

Basketball career
1994-95:  St. Rose (NCAA-D2): RebDivII-2(12.8), FGPDivII-3(.679), 14.2 ppg
1995-96:  St. Rose (NCAA-D2): 15.8 ppg, 11.8 rpg, 3.3 bpg
1996-97:  St. Rose (NCAA-D2)
1997-98:  Peristeri BC
1998-99:  Mansfield Hawks (IBA)
1999:  Atlantic City Seagulls (USBL), in May 1999 was placed on the inactive list
1999-00:  Nov. '99 Training Camp with Trenton Shooting Stars (IBL), then signed with team for the season: 6.9 ppg, 6.9 rpg
2000-01:  Toronto Raptors (2 games: 1 ppg, 1 rpg)
2001:  Denver Nuggets (2 games: 0 pts) Washington Wizards in Shaw's Pro Summer League, Boston
2001-05 :  Shaanxi Kylins
2005 :  Chalon-sur-Saône (Pro A)
2005-08:  Saba Battery
2008-09:  Al Gezira
2009 :  BEEM
2010:  Glam X-Men

References

External links
 Player bio from oasis.fortunecity.com
 Player statistics from basketball-reference.com

1973 births
Living people
Centers (basketball)
College men's basketball players in the United States
College of Saint Rose alumni
Denver Nuggets players
Dominica men's basketball players
Dominica expatriate basketball people in Canada
Dominica expatriate basketball people in China
Dominica expatriate basketball people in France
Dominica expatriate basketball people in Greece
Dominica expatriate basketball people in Iran
Dominica expatriate basketball people in the United States
Élan Chalon players
Dominica expatriate basketball people in Egypt
Guangzhou Loong Lions players
National Basketball Association players from Dominica
Toronto Raptors players
Trenton Shooting Stars players
Undrafted National Basketball Association players